Machail chandi Mata temple is a Goddess Durga shrine popularly known as Machail Mata. It is in the village Machail of Sub Division Paddar, from where it derives its name, in Kishtwar District of Jammu region in the Indian union territory of Jammu and Kashmir. It may be noted that Goddess Durga is also known by the name Kaali or Chandi.

Machail mata Sthan, as the shrine is popularly known, has a landscape of unblemished beauty with hills, glaciers and tributaries of the Chenab River. Paddar valley nearby is famous for its world-famous sapphire mines, and is a cool place for hiking, cannoning, and holy hot springs. The area is home to a Buddhist community and the Thakur community who are serpent worshipers, and was merged with Kishtwar tehsil, by Maharaja Ranbir Singh.
Thousands of people visit the shrine every year mainly from Jammu region. The pilgrimage happens in August only, every year. The idols and pindi form of Chandika are famous for shaking their jewellery of their own without any wind force or any shock and also flickering their closed eyes. There are a lot of supernatural happenings that the pilgrims experience and report.

History
The shrine has a beginning of antiquity and no recorded history. The goddess appeared in such remote area in "swayambhu" form. She first appeared in the form of fire flame in village Mindhal, Pangi Valley which is 60 km from Machail) and then in the form of Singhasan Mata (Saraswati) at village Chitto (which is 15 km from Gulabgarh). The fire later transformed into the form of Pindi. 
The actual shrine at Machail village is also swayambhu which has one pindi and three idols of Mahakali (Mindal), Mahalakshmi (Machail) and Mahasaraswati (Chitto Mata), which are considered to vibrate their jewellery by itself without any air or shock. The idols' eyes are closed in Dhyan mudra. Many pilgrims have experienced idols opening or flicking their eyes.

The temple's history is entwined with the conquests of Zorawar Singh Kahluria, who in 1834 sought blessings of Machelmata, before crossing the mountains and Suru River (Indus), with 5000 men for vanquishing an army of local Botis of Ladakh. He became a faithful devotee after the successful mission.

The shrine was visited in 1981 by Thakur Kulveer Singh of Bhaderwah, Jammu region. From 1987 onwards, Thakur Kulveer SIngh started 'Chhadi Yatra' (holy mace) that happens every year and thousands of people visit the shrine every year during 'Chhadi Yatra', which starts from Chinote in Bhaderwah to Machail in Paddar.

Location and how to Reach
Machail is a small village at an altitude of 2800m in the utmost scenic Padder Valley of Kishtwar district in Jammu region of J&K.Padder or Gulabgarh is 290 km from Jammu city and 66 km from Kishtwar. To reach the shrine, lot of travel agents arrange buses from Jammu, Udhampur, Ramnagar, Bhaderwah. One can also hire a cab as well. It takes approximately 10 hours by road from Jammu to Gulabgarh, as the distance is 290 km. The Gulabgarh is the base camp. 
From Gulabgarh, the foot journey starts, that is 32 km.  Usually people take 2 days to reach the shrine by foot. On the way there are many villages, where one can stay in the night. The chaddi takes three days to reach Machel.
Many people organizes roadside 'langers' (free food points) on the way to the Gulabgarh. Devotees are welcomed at various villages with them offering free Langars at Gulabgarh, Massu, Kundhail, Chishoti, Hamori and Machail. Government of Jammu & Kashmir also arranges basic amenities for the pilgrims. The shrine is inaccessible during the winter months of December, January and February.

Other mean of reaching the shrine is by helicopter from Jammu and Gulabgarh. The helipad is only 100 meters from the shrine. But if someone goes by helicopter, he will be missing many scenic beauties of the nature. Helicopter takes at least 7-8min to reach the Mata's darwar.

Highways
Paddar-Atholi-Machail-Zanskar-Kargil highway via Hagshu La tunnel will be constructed, see Hagshu tunnel route. Meanwhile Kishtwar to Machail Mata road has  been a completed under
PMGSY scheme.

References

External links 
 Wiki Map and Directions of the Shrine

Hindu pilgrimage sites in India
Hindu temples in Jammu and Kashmir